This table includes a list of countries by emergency contraceptive availability.

(LNG refers to Levonorgestrel and UPA refers to Ulipristal acetate).

References

Lists by country
Sexuality-related lists
Hormonal contraception
Reproductive rights